Aivis Jurdžs (born 24 August 1983) is a Latvian handball player for Tenax Dobele and the Latvian national team.

He represented Latvia at the 2020 European Men's Handball Championship.

References

External links

1983 births
Living people
Latvian male handball players